Philip Augustus White (1823–1891) was a pharmacist, aristocrat, advocate, and school board administrator. He was the Secretary for the Society of Education Among Colored Children and the first African American member of the Brooklyn Board of Education.

Life and career 
White was born in Hoboken, New Jersey in 1823. He was one of six children. His mother, Elizabeth, was born in Jamaica and was of mixed white and Black heritage. His father, Thomas, was a white Englishman. White was considered to be Black according to the 'one drop rule' and actively identified as such.

The White family moved to Manhattan when White was around eight years old.

White's father died when he was twelve years old. White and his mother earned money by performing cleaning and maintenance tasks for The Public School Society.

White attended Laurens Street School after which he apprenticed in James McCune Smith's Greenwich Village pharmacy. White graduated from the College of Pharmacy of the City of New York in 1844. He was the first African American person to graduate from the college.

White opened a successful drug store and was admitted to professional pharmaceutical societies.

Education advocacy 
White advocated for the education of African Americans. He was secretary of the New York Society for the Promotion of Education among Colored Children and a member of the New York African Society for Mutual Relief.

White was appointed to the Brooklyn Board of Education in 1882. He was the first African American person to sit on the board. During his term, he lobbied for integration of Brooklyn's schools.

Personal life 
White and his wife, Elizabeth Guignon, had three daughters.

References 

1823 births
1891 deaths
People from Hoboken, New Jersey
American people of Jamaican descent
American people of English descent
People from Manhattan
American pharmacists
School board members in New York (state)